Margaret E. Martin (May 6, 1912 – May 16, 2012) was an economist and statistician at the U.S. Bureau of the Budget from 1942 to 1973.  She was influential in the development of U.S. economic statistics and became president of the American Statistical Association.

Early life
Margaret Elizabeth Martin was the first child born to Harry Martin, a teacher, and Frances Martin in New York in 1912. Her younger siblings were Jane, Eleanor and Robert. As an elementary student, her teachers included noted economist Clara Eliot.

Education
In 1933, Martin received a bachelor's degree in economics from Barnard College, and went on to earn an MA and PhD in economics from Columbia University.

Career
Martin worked for the Division of Statistical Standards of the Bureau of the Budget beginning in 1942. The Current Population Survey, which has been the primary source of labor statistics within the country, was developed by Martin and others. The survey is produced by the United States Census Bureau and the U.S. Bureau of Labor Statistics now.

From 1973-1978 Martin was the first executive director of the Committee on National Statistics (CNSTAT) created by the United States National Research Council.

Recognition
In 1980, Martin became president of the American Statistical Association. She had already been a Fellow of the ASA since 1961.  In 1989 the Association awarded her its ASA Founders Award.

She was elected to the International Statistical Institute in 1973.

Death
Martin died May 16, 2012 of pneumonia and congestive heart failure at Suburban Hospital in Bethesda, Maryland. One of her sisters was alive at the time of her death.

Bibliography

References

American civil servants
Economists from New York (state)
American statisticians
Women statisticians
American economists
American women economists
United States Office of Management and Budget
2012 deaths
Fellows of the American Statistical Association
Presidents of the American Statistical Association
Elected Members of the International Statistical Institute
1912 births
21st-century American women